System of 5 is an album by jazz pianist Pandelis Karayorgis, which was recorded in 2008 and released on the Swiss hatOLOGY label. It was the debut recording of a new quintet with saxophonist Matt Langley, trombonist Jeff Galindo, bassist Jef Charland and drummer Luther Gray.

Reception
The All About Jazz review by Glenn Astarita states "The ensemble skirts the free side of matters, but the pianist's compositions are designed with structure. This is not another formulaic post-bop extravaganza, however; Karayorgis and the soloists weave between geometric-like architectures, amid a distinct sense of expressionism."

In another review for All About Jazz Troy Collins says "Expertly negotiating the tenuous divide between inside and outside traditions, System Of 5 is one of Karayorgis' most compelling releases—a stirring session that subtly expands upon the historical jazz continuum, inspired by the lessons of the past."

Track listing
All compositions by Pandelis Karayorgis
 "Transit" – 8:00
 "Two-ophony" – 7:45
 "Elastic" – 9:35
 "Seventh Wonder" – 6:32
 "Curt's Scape" – 4:13
 "Stray Line" – 3:38
 "Due East" – 7:31
 "Tones Not Notes" – 5:58

Personnel
Matt Langley - soprano sax, tenor sax
Jeff Galindo - trombone
Pandelis Karayorgis - piano
Jef Charland - bass
Luther Gray - drums

References

2011 albums
Pandelis Karayorgis albums
Hathut Records albums